The Sheffield Bears are a university ice hockey club from Sheffield, England who have teams in BUIHA northern divisions 1, 2, 3, and 5. They were formed in 2004 and play their home games at iceSheffield. The team's leading sponsor is The AMRC with Boeing. The club are also sponsored by Windows 8, Roland Smith Orthodontics, Walkabout, and Sheffield Parties. The Bears are currently Division 2 Southern Conference Play-Off Champions, National Play-Off Runners-up, and Division 1 National Champions.

The Bears, like several other member clubs of the BUIHA, are made up of students, 1st year alumni, and staff from more than one higher education establishment. Most of the players are affiliated with either The University of Sheffield or Sheffield Hallam University, although current and previous Bears teams have included players from Lincoln University and Barnsley College, amongst others. Once a year, two Varsity Games are played as part of the inter-university Varsity competition between the University of Sheffield and Sheffield Hallam University.

Winter Varsity
Ice Hockey is one of the 30 sports contested in the Varsity series between the University of Sheffield and Sheffield Hallam University. The Match is traditionally the finale of the Winter Varsity series, taking place in February alongside Skiing and Snowboarding.
In previous years, this has been held at IceSheffield, but in 2010, this match was played at the Hallam FM Arena in front of a crowd of 4,000 spectators. This made the 2010 match the largest varsity sport event ever hosted by the Sheffield universities, second only to that of the Nottingham Mavericks in terms of numbers.
Sheffield Hallam University are the current Ice Hockey Varsity champions, as well as Winter Varsity  champions overall for the first time, having won the 2010 varsity match 7-4.

History

2008/2009

During the 2008/09 season the Sheffield Bears fell just short of all three National Play-Offs, finishing as runners up in all divisions.

The Sheffield Bears C Team were also crowned as BUIHA Division 3 Northern Champions after an unbeaten run in their division. The C team traveled to Cardiff, who won the Division 3 Southern Championship, in the Division 3 'Cup Competition' Final. However, the Bears were comprehensively beaten 10-4, after being 9-1 down after 2 periods, the Bears began a comeback where they clawed the game back to 9-4 within the first 10 minutes, however they eventually lost the game.

The B team finished behind the Manchester Metros in their regular season, and had high hopes of making the playoffs, however, somewhat controversially, they missed out on going through as the highest points scoring runners up to Cardiff. The controversy arose because of the perceived underhand manner in which the Bears had been forced to forfeit a game away to the Huddersfield Ice Hawks. According to the Bears Executive Committee, advance notice had been given to the Ice Hawks that the proposed fixture date was unsuitable as it was the date of the hotly contested Winter Varsity showpiece game. A subsequent assertion from the Hawks that an alternative date would be found was made but not acted upon, causing the Bears to ultimately miss out and the Hawks register their sole win of the season. The B team fared relatively well at the National Championships, progressing from the group stages before being defeated 2-1 by the Imperial College Devils against the run of play.

The A team had a quiet season, suffering from low attendance and despite being regarded as the most deep and talented tier 1 side the Bears had ever produced, failed to make any real impression at the National Championships, not even progressing from the group stages.

2009/2010
The 2009/2010 season was again widely successful for all three Bears squads, who each finished in second place in their respective tables.
The C team finished just behind the much-fancied Nottingham Mavericks C team. The post season National Championship run started well but ended in the semi-final against Nottingham, being beaten by a last minute goal.

The B team again finished second to Manchester, but level on points, with only 4 goals separating the two teams, in Manchester's favour. Finishing second, due to a restructuring of the playoff format in tier 2, enabled the B-team to progress into the playoff rounds drawing the previous year's antagonists the Imperial College Devils. However, due to the inability of the Devils to ice a team, the B's advanced to the Southern Conference Playoff Final unchallenged. The Nottingham Mavericks were the opponents in this game, the Bears, with a home-ice advantage produced a masterful display to beat the Mavs 4-0. Inevitably, the opponents in the final were the Manchester Metros A team. After a less than impressive first two periods the Bears trailed 2-0 going into the third, and despite a much better display, the team tasted second place yet again, finishing 2-1 to the Metros.

The A team placed behind the Newcastle Wildcats rounded up a somewhat inconsistent season with their own playoff run. However, unlike the B team they fell at the first hurdle, away to a determined and well organised Nottingham A team. This only spurred the team on, with them going on to win the 2010 Tier 1 national Championships, defeating Nottingham in the final.

The club competed in the annual Winter Varsity competition, with players splitting into their respective University teams for one day only. Ice Hockey offered 1 point to whichever University could win the game towards their Varsity total. The night before at the Sheffield Ski Village, the Universities contested in Skiing and Snowboarding, and the event was tied at 2-2, meaning the Ice Hockey would be the deciding event. In its short history, the Sheffield University had never lost the Winter Varsity competition, but Sheffield Hallam had never lost the Ice Hockey, so something would have to give. Sheffield Hallam ran out eventual 7-4 winners in a memorable day with the game being held at the 8500 capacity Sheffield Arena in front of a crowd of 4000.

The club also hosted its premier Old Bears Vs. Newbies game, which was played between a Sheffield Bears Alumni select squad and current club members. Both teams were composed of players of various levels of skill, and the current Bears team emerged victorious in a high scoring contest. The game was played after the club's annual dinner and awards night.

2010/2011

The 2010/2011 season saw the Sheffield Bears grow considerably, entering a fourth team (Sheffield Bears B2) that would compete in the BUIHA Division II alongside the club's B team (Sheffield Bears B1).

References

External links

Ice hockey teams in England
University ice hockey teams in England